Kameleon FireEx KFX, often only referred to as KFX, is a commercial Computational Fluid Dynamics (CFD) program with main focus on gas dispersion and fire simulation.

KFX uses the k-epsilon model for turbulence modelling, the Eddy Dissipation Concept (EDC) for combustion modelling, and a radiation model based on the Discrete Transfer Method (DTM) by Lockwood and Shah.

External links 
 Standard k-epsilon model on CFD-wiki
 F.C. Lockwood and N.G. Shah, "A new radiation solution method for incorporation in general combustion prediction procedures", 18th Symposium (International) on Combustion, The Combustion Institute, Pittsburgh, PA, pp. 1405–1414 (1981), .

Computational fluid dynamics
Simulation software